Bakole or Bakolle may refer to:

Bakole people of Cameroon
Bakole language, spoken by the Bakole people